The Prime Minister of the Lugansk People's Republic, also referred to as Chairman of the Council of Ministers of the Lugansk People's Republic, was the head of government of the Russian puppet state of Lugansk People's Ukraine, on the territory of what the international community recognises as part of Ukraine.

Unlike in the neighbouring Donetsk People's Republic, the position of Prime Minister was abolished after the Russian annexation in 2022.

List

See also 

 Head of the Lugansk People's Republic

References

Politics of the Luhansk People's Republic